The women's volleyball tournament at the 2018 Mediterranean Games was held from 22 June to 1 July at the Tarraco Arena Plaza and the Pabellón Municipal del Serrallo in Tarragona.

Participating teams

 (host)

Preliminary round
All times are local (UTC+2).

Group A

Group B

Group C

Group D

Final round

Classification bracket

Classification 5–8

Seventh place game

Fifth place game

Championship bracket

Quarterfinals

Semifinals

Third place game

Final

Final standings

References

External links
2018 Mediterranean Games

Volleyball at the 2018 Mediterranean Games